Robert Woodhouse  (28 April 177323 December 1827) was a British mathematician and astronomer.

Biography

Early life and education
Robert Woodhouse was born on 28 April 1773 in Norwich, Norfolk, the son of Robert Woodhouse, linen draper, and Judith Alderson, the daughter of a Unitarian minister from Lowestoft. Robert junior was baptised at St George's Church, Colegate, Norwich, on 19 May, 1773. A younger son, John Thomas Woodhouse, was born in 1780.

In May 1790 Woodhouse was admitted to Gonville and Caius College, Cambridge, the college where Paston pupils were traditionally sent. In 1795 he graduated as the Senior Wrangler (ranked first among the mathematics undergraduates at the university), and took the First Smith's Prize. He obtained his Master's degree at Cambridge in 1798.

Marriage and career at Cambridge

Woodhouse was a fellow of the college from 1798 to 1823, after which he resigned so as to be able to marry Harriet, the daughter of William Wilkin, a Norwich architect. They were married on 20 February 1823; the marriage produced a son, also named Robert. Harriet Woodhouse died at Cambridge on 31 March 1826.

Woodhouse was elected a Fellow of the Royal Society on 16 December 1802. His earliest work, entitled the Principles of Analytical Calculation, was published at Cambridge in 1803. In this he explained the differential notation and strongly pressed the employment of it; but he severely criticised the methods used by continental writers, and their constant assumption of non-evident principles.

In 1809 Woodhouse published a textbook covering planar trigonometry and spherical trigonometry and the next year a historical treatise on the calculus of variations and isoperimetrical problems. He next produced an astronomy; of which the first book (usually bound in two volumes), on practical and descriptive astronomy, was issued in 1812, and the second book, containing an account of the treatment of physical astronomy by Pierre-Simon Laplace and other continental writers, was issued in 1818.

Woodhouse became the Lucasian Professor of Mathematics in 1820, but the small income caused him to resign the professorship in 1822 and instead accept the better paid post as the Plumian professor in the university. As Plumian Professor he was responsible for installing and adjusting the transit instruments and clocks at the Cambridge Observatory.

Woodhouse did not exercise much influence on the majority of his contemporaries, and the movement might have died away for the time being if it had not been for the advocacy of George Peacock, Charles Babbage, and John Herschel, who formed the Analytical Society, with the object of advocating the general use in the university of analytical methods and of the differential notation. Woodhouse was the first director of the newly built observatory at Cambridge, a post he held until his death in 1827.

On his death in Cambridge he was buried in Caius College chapel.

Notes

References

Sources

Further reading

External links
 Facsimile of Woodhouse's certificate of election to the Royal Society

Works
 1803: Principles of Analytical Calculation
 1809: A Treatise on Plane and Spherical Trigonometry (5th edition 1827)
 1810: A Treatise on Isoperimetric Problems and the Calculus of Variations
 1818: An Elementary Treatise on Physical Astronomy, volume 1
 1818: An Elementary Treatise on Astronomy, volume 2
 1821: A Treatise on Astronomy, Theoretical and Practical

1773 births
1827 deaths
Burials in Cambridgeshire
People from Norwich
19th-century English mathematicians
Lucasian Professors of Mathematics
Mathematical analysts
Senior Wranglers
Fellows of the Royal Society
Alumni of Gonville and Caius College, Cambridge
Fellows of Gonville and Caius College, Cambridge
Plumian Professors of Astronomy and Experimental Philosophy